Frankville is a ghost town in Garrett County, Maryland. The geography of Frankville is largely mountainous.

History 
Frankville was settled and a post office established at some point prior to 1853. In 1853, the Frankville Road Company was incorporated by law. In 1856, Frankville included 2 sawmills and 17 residences. Frankville was located near Floyd, and at one time around the turn of the 20th century housed a rail station on the Baltimore and Ohio Railroad. There were still residents recorded in Frankville in 1912.

Death of Francis Thomas 
One of the more notable events to happen in Frankville was the 1876 death of Francis Thomas, who was the Governor of Maryland from 1842 to 1845. Thomas was struck by a train on 22 January 1876 while walking alongside railroad tracks in Frankville. Thomas came to Frankville in 1820 to practice law. On the afternoon of 22 January 1876, Thomas had been walking along railroad tracks near his home, when he was run over by an eastbound engine of the B&O Railroad, crushing his skull before ejecting his body from the track. The stretch of track where Thomas had been walking contained a sharp curve, preventing Thomas or the conductor from seeing each other coming.

See also 

 Blooming Rose, Maryland
 List of ghost towns in Maryland
 List of American railroad accidents

References 

Ghost towns in Maryland